Humphrey David Boone, Jr. (October 30, 1951 – March 26, 2005) was an All-Star Canadian Football League defensive lineman, winner of 5 Grey Cups.

Career

Rookie Year
Boone graduated from Eastern Michigan University and was drafted by the Minnesota Vikings. He played 5 games in 1974, the year the team went to Super Bowl VIII.

Years in CFL
He moved on to Canada, playing with the BC Lions in 1975 (6 games) and the Hamilton Tiger-Cats in 1976.

He began an All-Star career with the Edmonton Eskimos in 1977, becoming a vital part of their famed "Alberta Crude" defence. He was a CFL all-star in 1981, a three-time West Division all-star (1977, 1979, 1981) and won 5 Grey Cup rings.

He finished his career playing 15 games for the Toronto Argonauts in 1984.

Death 
His body was discovered outside of his house in the resort community of Point Roberts, Washington. On November 19, 2008, the CBC Television show The Fifth Estate suggested that Boone, who killed himself after many years of depression, suffered from the effects of years of unreported head injuries from playing professional football. Teammates York Hentschel and Bill Stevenson are believed to have suffered from the same injuries. The David Boone Award was created in 2005 in memory of him 
David is survived by his son Kenan Joseph

References

External links
 Dave Boone databasefootball.com

1951 births
2005 deaths
American football defensive ends
BC Lions players
Canadian football defensive linemen
Cass Technical High School alumni
Eastern Michigan Eagles football players
Eastern Michigan University alumni
Edmonton Elks players
Hamilton Tiger-Cats players
Minnesota Vikings players
Players of American football from Detroit
Toronto Argonauts players
Sportspeople with chronic traumatic encephalopathy